Telecommunications in the European Union may refer to telecommunications in the 27 member states of the European Union:

Telecommunications in Austria
Telecommunications in Belgium
Telecommunications in Bulgaria
Telecommunications in Croatia
Telecommunications in Cyprus
Telecommunications in the Czech Republic
Telecommunications in Denmark
Telecommunications in Estonia
Telecommunications in Finland
Telecommunications in France
Telecommunications in Germany
Telecommunications in Greece
Telecommunications in Hungary
Telecommunications in the Republic of Ireland
Telecommunications in Italy
Telecommunications in Latvia
Telecommunications in Lithuania
Telecommunications in Luxembourg
Telecommunications in Malta
Telecommunications in the Netherlands
Telecommunications in Poland
Telecommunications in Portugal
Telecommunications in Romania
Telecommunications in Slovakia
Telecommunications in Slovenia
Telecommunications in Spain
Telecommunications in Sweden